Ian Mayelston Mudie (1 March 1911 – 23 October 1976) was an Australian poet and author.

Early life and education
Mudie was born in 1911 in Hawthorn, South Australia, son of Henry Mayelston Mudie, an accountant, and his second wife Gertrude Mary. Mudie attended Scotch College, Adelaide from 1920 to 1926, but did not graduate. After school he attempted to make a living from freelance writing but also pursued work as a "wool-scourer, furniture-dealer, grape-picker, and as a salesman of insurance and real estate".

Writing career

Mudie published his first poem in 1931. Encouraged by P. R. Stephensen, who published one of his poems in his magazine The Publicist in 1937, he became associated with the Jindyworobak Movement in 1939 and in 1941 moved to Sydney and became involved in the Australia First Movement. Historian David Bird has written that "Ian Mudie proved the most strident champion of the cultural line taken by Australia First and the Jindies, although he was not a member of either group at the outbreak of the war." In this period, P. R. Stephensen described Mudie's work as containing a "deep urge towards the elemental spirit of our own land, its courageous, fundamental Australianism".

He was a friend of Miles Franklin and Colin Thiele, and attracted favourable criticism from Xavier Herbert.

He took an active part in various national writers' bodies in Australia. He was a strong critic of Australia's treatment of Indigenous people. The Australian literary historian Bruce Clunies-Ross wrote:

After the Second World War Mudie was the recipient of a fellowship from the Commonwealth Literary Fund to conduct research into the paddlesteamers of the Murray-Darling river system and in 1961 published the book Riverboats. He also wrote a history of Admella, which in 1859 was wrecked off the south-east coast of South Australia, one of Australia's worst maritime disasters, and a new history of John McDouall Stuart's epic crossing of the Australian continent in 1861–1862.

In 1963 Mudie won the Grace Leven Prize for Poetry for The North-Bound Rider.

Works

Verse

 Corroboree to the Sun (1940)
 This Is Australia (1941)
 The Australian Dream (1943)
 Their Seven Stars Unseen (1943)
 Poems 1934—1944 (1945)
 The Blue Crane (1959)
 The North-Bound Rider (1963)
 Look, the Kingfisher (1970)
 Selected Poems 1934—1974 (1976)

Editor
Poets at War: An anthology of Verse by Australian Servicemen (1944)
The Jindyworobak Anthology (1946)

Non-fiction
Riverboats (1961)
Wreck of the Admella (1966)
The Heroic Journey of John McDouall Stuart (1968)
Australia Today (1970)

Fiction
’’The Christmas Kangaroo’’ (1946)

Family
Ian was the grandson of well-known Anglican minister William Henry Mudie. His father, Henry Mayelston Mudie, was influential in the growth of the Savings Bank of South Australia. He married Renee Dunford Doble on 30 October 1934.

He died in London and his ashes were scattered on the Murray River.

His middle name is sometimes reported as "Mayelstone".

Sources
Wilde, William H., Hooton, Joy and Andrews, Barry The Oxford Companion to Australian Literature Oxford University Press, Melbourne 2nd ed.

References

1911 births
1976 deaths
Writers from Adelaide
20th-century Australian poets
Australian male poets
20th-century Australian historians
20th-century Australian male writers